Schenella is a genus of fungi in the family Geastraceae. The widely distributed genus contains four species. The genus was circumscribed by Thomas Huston Macbride in 1911. Pyrenogaster, described in 1977, is a later synonym.

References

Geastraceae
Agaricomycetes genera